Alexander Watt (September 26, 1834 – June 16, 1914) was an American politician in the state of Washington. He served in the Washington State Senate from 1889 to 1893.

References

1834 births
1914 deaths
Republican Party Washington (state) state senators
People from Jefferson County, Ohio
19th-century American politicians
People from Cheney, Washington